The Manfield Non-Life Master Pairs national bridge championship is held at the fall American Contract Bridge League (ACBL) North American Bridge Championship (NABC).

The Manfield Non-Life Master Pairs is either a two or four session MP pairs event depending on the number of entrants.
If it is a four session event, there are two qualifying sessions and two final sessions.
The event typically starts on the first Friday of the NABC.
The event is restricted to those that have not attained the rank of Life Master.

History
The event was introduced in 1981 as the Miles Non-Life Master Pairs, named after Rufus L. "Skinny" Miles Jr. It was renamed in 2010 after ACBL Hall of Fame member Ed Manfield.

Winners

Sources

List of previous winners, Page 7

2008 winners, Page 1

Renaming, Page 4

External links
ACBL official website

North American Bridge Championships